, there were around 158,000 electric vehicles in Italy. In July 2022, 3.3% of new cars registered in Italy were fully electric, and 4.6% were plug-in hybrid.

, the Fiat New 500 was the best-selling electric car in Italy.

Government policy
, the Italian government offers subsidies of €7,500 for purchases of battery electric vehicles, and €6,000 for plug-in hybrid vehicles.

Charging stations
, there were 10,503 public charging stations in Italy.

Public opinion
In an October 2022 poll conducted by Areté, 63% of respondents who have tried an electric car said that they wanted to buy one in the future; this is a decline from 87% in March 2022.

By region

Lombardy
Starting in 2024, all car sharing services in Milan will be prohibited from using gasoline-powered vehicles.

References

Italy
Road transport in Italy